Nikitikha is a rural locality (a village) in Zaborskoye Rural Settlement, Tarnogsky District, Vologda Oblast, Russia. The population was 25 as of 2002.

Geography 
Nikitikha is located 25 km southwest of Tarnogsky Gorodok (the district's administrative centre) by road. Voroninskaya is the nearest rural locality.

References 

Rural localities in Tarnogsky District